GAP (Groups, Algorithms and Programming) is a computer algebra system for computational discrete algebra with particular emphasis on computational group theory.

History
GAP was developed at Lehrstuhl D für Mathematik (LDFM), Rheinisch-Westfälische Technische Hochschule Aachen, Germany from 1986 to 1997. After the retirement of Joachim Neubüser from the chair of LDFM, the development and maintenance of GAP was coordinated by the School of Mathematical and Computational Sciences at the University of St Andrews, Scotland. In the summer of 2005 coordination was transferred to an equal partnership of four 'GAP Centres', located at the University of St Andrews, RWTH Aachen, Technische Universität Braunschweig, and Colorado State University at Fort Collins; in April 2020, a fifth GAP Centre located at the TU Kaiserslautern was added.

Distribution
GAP and its sources, including packages (sets of user contributed programs), data library (including a list of small groups) and the manual, are distributed freely, subject to "copyleft" conditions. GAP runs on any Unix system, under Windows, and on Macintosh systems. The standard distribution requires about 300 MB (about 400 MB if all the packages are loaded).

The user contributed packages are an important feature of the system, adding a great deal of functionality. GAP offers package authors the opportunity to submit these packages for a process of peer review, hopefully improving the quality of the final packages, and providing recognition akin to an academic publication for their authors. , there are 151 packages distributed with GAP, of which approximately 71 have been through this process.

An interface is available for using the SINGULAR computer algebra system from within GAP.  GAP is also included in the mathematical software system SageMath.

Sample session
 gap> G:=SmallGroup(8,1); # Set G to be a group of order 8.
 
 gap> i:=IsomorphismPermGroup(G); # Find an isomorphism from G to a group of permutations.
 
 gap> Image(i,G); # The image of G under I - these are the generators of im G.
 
 gap> Elements(Image(i,G)); # All the elements of im G.

See also

 Comparison of computer algebra systems

References

External links
 
  

Computer algebra system software for Linux
Computer algebra system software for macOS
Computer algebra system software for Windows
Free computer algebra systems